The dermatocranium is the portion of the cranium that is composed of dermal bone, as opposed to the endocranium and splanchnocranium, which are composed of endochondral bone. The dermatocranium comprises the skull roof, the facial skeleton (usually excluding the dentary), and—in fishes—the opercular bones.

References 

Human anatomy
Vertebrate anatomy